The 2011 Tour of Qatar was the tenth edition of the Tour of Qatar cycling stage race. It was rated as a 2.1 event on the UCI Asia Tour, and was held from 6 February to 11 February 2011, in Qatar.

Teams
Sixteen teams competed in the 2011 Tour of Qatar. These included ten UCI ProTour teams, five UCI Professional Continental teams, and one Continental team. Each team entered a squad of eight riders, giving the Tour a peloton of 158 riders.
The teams participating in the race were:

Farnese Vini-Neri Sottoli

An Post–Sean Kelly

Stages

Prologue
6 February 2011 - Cultural Village,  (ITT)

Traditionally time trials are ridden on bicycles made specifically for these events. However, being as this was the only time trial in the tour - and a short one - the teams were not allowed to bring time trial bikes and helmets. 
Lars Boom won the short 2.5 km time trial, edging world champion Fabian Cancellara by 4 seconds.

Stage 1
7 February 2011 - Dukhan to Al Khor Corniche,

Stage 2
8 February 2011 - Camel Race Track to Doha Golf Club,

Stage 3
9 February 2011 - Al Wakra to Mesaieed,

Stage 4
10 February 2011 - West Bay Lagoon to Al Kharaitiyat,

Stage 5
11 February 2011 - Sealine Beach Resort to Doha Corniche,

Classification leadership
In the 2011 Tour of Qatar, three different jerseys are awarded. For the general classification, calculated by adding each cyclist's finishing times on each stage, and allowing time bonuses for the first three finishers on each stage and in intermediate sprints, the leader receives a golden jersey. This classification is considered the most important of the Tour of Qatar, and the winner is considered the winner of the Tour.

Additionally, there is a points classification, which awards a silver jersey. In the points classification, cyclists get points for finishing in the top three in an intermediate sprint or the top twenty of a stage. The first in an intermediate sprint gets 3 points, second 2, and third a single point. The stage win affords 30 points, second is worth 27 points, 25 for third, 23 for fourth, 21 for fifth, 19 for sixth, 17 for seventh, 15 for eighth, 13 for ninth, 11 for tenth, and one point less per place down the line, to a single point for twentieth.

There is also a youth classification, which awards a blue jersey. This classification is calculated the same as the general classification, but only riders born on or after January 1, 1986, are eligible.

The race also awards a teams classification, which is not represented by a jersey. The teams classification is calculated by adding the times of each team's best three riders per stage per day.

Final standings

General classification

Points classification

See also
2011 in men's road cycling
2011 in Qatar

References

External links

Tour of Qatar
Tour of Qatar
2011